Le Sieur Township is a township in New Madrid County, in the U.S. state of Missouri. Its population was 585 as of the 2010 census.

References

Townships in Missouri
Townships in New Madrid County, Missouri